Yitzchok Dov Koppelman (May 1905 – June 17, 2011) was born in Vasilishki, Belarus. He was the head of the 1915-founded Lucerne Yeshiva in Switzerland for nearly 50 years.

A year before he died, a report about his visit from Switzerland to Melbourne, Australia was titled "World's oldest rabbi visits Oz". While the main purpose of his trip was to raise additional funds for his yeshiva, he gave a number of public lectures: at an elementary school, a high school, a Kollel, and a major shul.

Career
Koppelman was "a leading disciple of Rabbi Shimon Shkop," having been at the latter's yeshiva for 18 years.

Prior to World War II he ran a yeshiva; after the war he established two more: one in Europe, another in Brooklyn, the latter "named after the well known sefer by the same name written by R' Shimon Shkop."

His work in Switzerland began in 1963. The Yeshiva was based in Obernau in the canton of Lucerne (municipality of Kriens), where Koppelman worked for 48 years and taught and inspired thousands of students from all over the world, including "Western Europe.. the United Kingdom, .. the United States of America, Canada, Eretz Yisroel and even Australia." as well as from Central and South America.

End of life
He was referred to as Zekan Roshei HaYeshivos (the world’s senior Rosh HaYeshiva), and lived to the age of 106.

Koppelman's health permitted a trip from Switzerland to Australia the prior June. After being "hospitalized for" the prior "few weeks" he passed away. His body was transferred to Jerusalem and solemnly buried there in the presence of thousands of people.

It was noted that Koppelman's passing was within the same two weeks that included those of Rabbi Michel Yehuda Lefkowitz
and Rabbi Chaim Stein.

References

 This work began as a machine translation of a German-language wiki article. Initial editing was to incorporate material from a 2/3 page detailed obituary (he lived to 106). Subsequent touching up was to incorporate information (and citations) found via google.

1905 births
2011 deaths
20th-century Swiss rabbis
21st-century Swiss rabbis
Orthodox rabbis